The 2009–10 season was one of the most successful seasons in the history of KK Partizan. The club reached the F4 of Euroleague, won the regional NLB League, the Serbian cup and the Basketball League of Serbia.

Players

Roster

Depth chart

Roster changes
In
  Sava Lešić (from  Superfund)
  Milt Palacio (from  Khimiki)
  Stefan Sinovec (from  Khimik)
  Aleksandar Mitrović (from  Mega Hypo Leasing)
  Aleks Marić (from  Granada)
  Dušan Kecman (from  Panathinaikos)
  Lawrence Roberts (from  Crvena zvezda)
  Bo McCalebb (from  Mersin BB)
  Branislav Đekić (from youth categories)

Out
  Milenko Tepić (to  Panathinaikos)
  Bogdan Riznić (to  Vojvodina Srbijagas)
  Uroš Tripković (to  DKV Joventut)
  Stéphane Lasme (to  Maccabi Tel Aviv)
  Novica Veličković (to  Real Madrid)
  Čedomir Vitkovac (to  Budućnost Podgorica)
  Vukašin Aleksić (to  Radnički Kragujevac)
  Milt Palacio (to  Kavala)
  Žarko Rakočević (to  Gorštak Kolašin)

Preseason and friendlies

Euroleague US Tour

Competitions

Adriatic League

Standings

Regular season

Final four

Semifinals

Final

Kup Radivoja Koraća

Quarterfinals

Semifinals

Final

Euroleague

Regular season

Group B

Top 16

Quarterfinals

Final Four

Semifinal

Third-place playoff

Individual awards
Euroleague

All-EuroLeague First Team
 Aleks Marić

All-EuroLeague Second Team
 Bo McCalebb

Euroleague MVP of the Month
 Aleks Marić, December

Euroleague Weekly MVPs
 Aleks Marić - Regular season, Week 5
 Aleks Marić - Regular season, Week 7
 Aleks Marić - Regular season, Week 8
 Dušan Kecman - Playoffs, Game 1

Adriatic League

MVP of the Round
 Aleks Marić – Round 4
 Slavko Vraneš – Round 15

Radivoj Korać Cup

Finals MVP
 Aleks Marić

Basketball League of Serbia

Finals MVP
 Bo McCalebb

External links
 Official website

KK Partizan seasons
Partizan
Partizan